In Greek mythology, Thrasymedes (Ancient Greek: Θρασυμήδης means 'bold of thought') may refer to 

 Thrasymedes, son of King Nestor of Pylos and an Achaean warrior.
 Thrasymedes, one of the Suitors of Penelope who came from Dulichium along with other 56 wooers. He, with the other suitors, was slain by Odysseus with the help of Eumaeus, Philoetius, and Telemachus.

Notes

Reference 

 Apollodorus, The Library with an English Translation by Sir James George Frazer, F.B.A., F.R.S. in 2 Volumes, Cambridge, MA, Harvard University Press; London, William Heinemann Ltd. 1921. ISBN 0-674-99135-4. Online version at the Perseus Digital Library. Greek text available from the same website.

Suitors of Penelope